K C Palanisamy is an Indian politician, former Member of Parliament (MP) and Member of Legislative Assembly (MLA) Tamil Nadu (TN). A former member of All India Anna Dravida Munnetra Kazhagam (AIADMK), he served the Dravidian party founded by former Chief Minister (CM) of Tamil Nadu, M G Ramachandran (MGR) on 17 October 1972. He was born and raised in Chennimalai, Erode District of Tamil Nadu. At the age of 9, K C Palanisamy met MGR and got influenced by the mission and vision of AIADMK. His political career began at age of 13. In 1972, he joined AIADMK as a party member. K C Palanisamy was handpicked by former CM of Tamil Nadu, MGR as Deputy District Secretary of AIADMK’s Youth Wing in 1982, at the age of 23. In 1984, he was elected as the party’s youngest Member of Legislative Assembly (MLA) for Kangeyam constituency in Thiruppur District. In 1989, K C Palanisamy chosen to contest in Assembly election as Member of Parliament (MP) by Jayalalitha and won with the second highest vote difference Nationally and highest difference in the State.

Biography 

K C Palanisamy was handpicked by both MGR and J Jayalalitha to strengthen and guide AIADMK. After the demise Jayalalitha in 2016, K C Palanisamy opposed V K Sasikala being appointed as AIADMK’s General Secretary, stating that General Secretary should be elected by cadres. A staunch believer of Annaism and follower of MGR and Jayalalitha's political ideology.

Early life and education 

In his early school days K C Palanisamy got motivated and inspired by MGR‘s mission and vision. At his age of 9years, he met MGR during the bi-election campaign for Perundurai constituency. This was the point where K C Palanisamy realized that he has to follow the path of MGR and had the ability to formulate opinions and views about society.

References

External links
 Members of Fourteenth Lok Sabha - Parliament of India website

Living people
Indian Tamil people
Lok Sabha members from Tamil Nadu
1959 births
All India Anna Dravida Munnetra Kazhagam politicians
Tamil Nadu MLAs 1985–1989